The Belt Railroad Engine House and Sandhouse, also known as Beltline Railroad Roundhouse and Sandhouse, in San Francisco, California, was listed on the National Register of Historic Places in 1986.

It served the San Francisco Belt Railroad.  The property includes an engine house/roundhouse known as the Engine House and later as the roundhouse, which was built in 1913, and an auxiliary building known as the sandhouse, which was built in 1914.  Both buildings are made of reinforced concrete, finished with cement plaster.

The property comprises the block bounded by Lombard St., Sansome St., and the Embarcadero.  It was designed and/or built by Newman, Freeman & Alden.

It was designated City and County of San Francisco Landmark #114.

References

External links

Railway roundhouses on the National Register of Historic Places
Railroad roundhouses in California
Engine houses
National Register of Historic Places in San Francisco
Buildings and structures completed in 1913